The Beighton Branch was a railway branch line built by the Lancashire, Derbyshire and East Coast Railway (LD&ECR) in north eastern Derbyshire, England.

History

The line was a little over 12 miles long and ran from Langwith Junction in Derbyshire to Beighton Junction which is now in South Yorkshire.

Building started in 1892. The line opened in stages up to 1900.

The branch was occasionally referred to as the "Sheffield Branch", but the name "Beighton Branch" stuck and was widely used.

The line closed in stages:

 1967, middle section closed and lifted
 1974, southern end closed and lifted
 1984, northern end closed and lifted, except for a short length at the very end, retained as a siding.

References

Notes

Sources

Closed railway lines in the East Midlands
Rail transport in Derbyshire
Railway lines opened in 1900
Railway lines closed in 1984